Spinipogon resthavenensis is a species of moth of the family Tortricidae. It is found in North America, where it has been recorded from Ontario and Ohio to Florida and Texas. The habitat consists of tallgrass prairies.

The wingspan is about 9 mm. Adults have been recorded on wing in July.

Etymology
The species is named to honor the prairies at Resthaven Wildlife Area at Castalia, Ohio.

References

Moths described in 2002
Cochylini